Kara-Kulja is a district of Osh Region in south-western Kyrgyzstan. The administrative seat lies at Kara-Kulja.

Population

According to the 2009 Census, the ethnic composition (de jure population) of the Kara-Kulja District was 99.9% Kyrgyz and 0.1% other groups.

Rural communities and villages
In total, Kara-Kulja District contains 55 villages in 12 rural communities. The rural communities and villages in Kara-Kulja District are as follows:

 Alaykuu (seat: Kök-Art; incl. Kan-Korgon, Say-Talaa, Ara-Bulak, Börü-Tokoy and Jele-Döbö)
 Chalma (seat: Tokbay-Talaa; incl. Buyga, Besh-Kempir and Orto-Talaa)
 Kapchygay (seat: Sary-Bee; incl. Kara-Tash, Terek-Suu and Nichke-Suu)
 Karaguz (seat: Jangy-Talaa; incl. Altyn-Kürök, Jetim-Döbö, Kalmatay, Kara-Jygach and Nasirdin)
 Kara-Kochkor (seat: Kara-Kochkor; incl. Ak-Kyya, Kashka-Jol and Sary-Bulak)
 Kara-Kulja (seat: Kara-Kulja; incl. Biy-Myrza, Birinchi May and Sary-Kamysh)
 Kashka-Jol (seat: Togotoy; incl. Jangy-Talap, Jiyde, Oktyabr and Yntymak)
 Kengesh (seat: Kengesh; incl. Por)
 Kyzyl-Jar (seat: Kyzyl-Jar; incl. Kayyng-Talaa, Koo-Chaty, Terek, Chychyrkanak and Küyötash)
 Oy-Tal (seat: Oy-Tal; incl. Köndük)
 Sary-Bulak (seat: Sary-Bulak; incl. Kara-Bulak, Konokbay-Talaa, Kyzyl-Bulak, Sary-Künggöy, Tegerek-Saz and Toguz-Bulak)
 Ylay-Talaa (seat: Ylay-Talaa; incl. Say, Sharkyratma, Jylkol and Sary-Tash)

References 

Districts of Osh Region